Arben Kucana is a German-Albanian sport shooter who competes in the olympic pistol disciplines. At the 2012 Summer Olympics, he finished 20th in the 10m air pistol qualifying round.  He has lived in Germany since 1990 and actively participates in national shooting competitions in both Germany and Albania.

Weblinks 
 Arben kucana at the International Shooting Sport Federation database

References

Albanian male sport shooters
Living people
Olympic shooters of Albania
Shooters at the 2012 Summer Olympics
1967 births
Shooters at the 2015 European Games
European Games competitors for Albania